Battle Hymns for Children Singing is the only studio album by English new wave band Haysi Fantayzee, released in 1983.

Content
The album features two UK Top 20 singles: "John Wayne Is Big Leggy" (UK No. 11) and "Shiny Shiny" (UK No. 16). The singles "Holy Joe" (UK No. 51) and "Sister Friction" (UK No. 62) weren't included on the original release of the album but were added to a 2000 CD release in the United States, which also includes remixes and B-sides as bonus tracks. A 2007 CD release by Cherry Pop, retitled The Very Best of Haysi Fantayzee, but otherwise featuring similar track listing and artwork to the original album, also includes "Holy Joe" and "Sister Friction" as well as remixes and B-sides as bonus tracks.

Track listing 

Note
On the CD versions, "Make Me a Sinner" is joined onto the end of the same track as "Shoofly Love" and is uncredited.

Personnel
Adapted from AllMusic.

Musicians
Haysi Fantayzee
Jeremy Healy – primary vocals
Kate Garner – primary vocals
Paul Caplin – keyboards

Additional musicians
Afrodiziak – background vocals
Alfie Agius – bass guitar
Big George – bass guitar
Kevin Bird – guitar
Andy Duncan – percussion
Simon Henri – saxophone
Robbie McIntosh – guitar
John Sherwood – guitar
Dick Simpson – guitar
Bobby Valentino – violin
Tony Visconti – guitar

Production
Steve Brown – producer
Paul Caplin – arranger, producer, programming
Vic Coppersmith – producer
Elliott Federman – mastering
Simon Fowler – photography
Bruce Harris – liner notes
David Richman – production coordination
Graham Smith – original graphics
David Thomas – animation
Vincent M. Vero – compilation producer
Tony Visconti – producer
Alan Winstanley – producer

Charts

References

External links
 
Battle Hymns for Children Singing (original LP & cassette) at Discogs
Battle Hymns for Children Singing (US CD version) at Discogs
The Best of Haysi Fantayzee  at Discogs

1983 debut albums
Haysi Fantayzee albums
Albums produced by Tony Visconti
Albums produced by Alan Winstanley